Laurent Poliquin (born June 12, 1975) is a Franco-Manitoban poet, educator and a community activist. He is a member of the Green Party of Canada.

Biography 
He studied philosophy at the University of Quebec at Trois-Rivières and completed a MA in French studies at the University of British Columbia. In 1999, he moved to Winnipeg and completed a Bachelor of Education at Université de Saint-Boniface, for which he was awarded the prestigious Government of France Award. He works as a journalist and radio host before becoming a teacher. In 2008, he began a doctorate in French studies at the University of Manitoba (Canada) after holding editorial functions at Éditions des Plaines (2003–2009). In 2009 he was introduce as a member of the research center Young People's Text and Culture of the University of Winnipeg (CRYTC) and works as an editor for the international journal Youth: Young People, Texts, Cultures. He is also an honorary member of the International Scientific Council of the magazine Otago French Notes of New Zealand. He is the author of fifteen books.

Winner of the Alliance Française Award in Molsheim (Alsace) in 2002, Poliquin participated in the Toronto International Book Fair (2003), the Salon du livre de Paris (2007), the Trois-Rivières International Poetry Festival (2001, 2003 and 2005) and the Winnipeg International Writers Festival (2001 to 2010). His poems have been published in Quebec (Le Sabord, Moebius and Ellipse), in Canada (Contemporary Verse 2, Canadian Literature) in France (Poésie sur Seine, Casse-Pieds, Le Temps des Cerises) and Italy (Ibiskos Editrice Risolo).

Works

Poetry 
Volute velours, Éditions des Plaines, 2001
L'ondoiement du désir, Éditions des Plaines, 2003 
Le vertigo du tremble, Éditions des Plaines, 2005
La Métisse filante, Éditions L'Harmattan, 2008
Orpailleur de bisous, Éditions L'Interligne, 2010
Marchand d'intensité, Éditions L'Harmattan, 2012
 Le maniement des larmes, Éditions des Plaines, 2013
 De l'amuïssement des certitudes, Jacques André Éditeur, 2014 (Rue-Deschambault Literary Award)
 Voyageur des interstices, L'Harmattan, 2018
 L'ivresse fragile de l'aube, L'Harmattan, 2021
 Le petit bruit du poème, Éditions du Blé, 2022

Essay 
La quête du séducteur ou le messianisme diabolique, Primo Mobile éditeur, 2012
De l'impuissance à l'autonomie. Évolution culturelle et enjeux identitaires des minorités canadiennes-françaises, Prise de Parole, 2017.
Les foudres du silence : l'estomac fragile de la littérature francophone au Canada, L'Harmattan, 2019.

Short Stories 

Litterarum virus, Primo Mobile éditeur, 2016

Collective works 
 L'Autre en mémoire, directed by Dominique Laporte, Presses de l'Université Laval, 2006.
 La Joie, an anthology prepared by Danielle Shelton, Paris / Montreal, cherries Time / Sayings 2006.
 Aria Acqua Terre Fuoco anthology established by Gabriella Valera Gruber, Florence, Ibiskos Editrice Risolo 2006.
 Plaisir du texte, texte de plaisir : l'oeuvre de J.R. Léveillé, directed by Lise Gaboury-Diallo, Presses Universitaires de Saint-Boniface, 2007.
 Saint-Boniface 1908–2008 : reflets d'une ville, directed by André Fauchon and Carol J. Harvey, Presses Universitaires de Saint-Boniface, 2008
 Sillons : hommage à Gabrielle Roy directed by Lise Gaboury-Diallo, Éditions du Blé 2009.
 Transplanter le Canada : Semailles / Transplanting Canada: Seedlings, directed by Marie Carrière and Jerry White, Edmonton, Canadian Literature Centre, 2009
 Littératures francophones minoritaires (Canada, 1999–2010) : Entretiens et textes , directed by Catherine Parayre, Vienna, Praesens Verlag, 2011.
  Nous, la multitude,  anthology established by Françoise Coulmin, Paris: Le Temps des cerises, 2011.
  Against innocence: Aesthetics of children's literature in commitment,  directed by Britta Benert and P. Clermont, Frankfurt am Main: Peter Lang Verlag, 2011
 Paroles francophones de l'Ouest et du Nord canadiens, directed by Carol Harvey, Presses Universitaires de Saint-Boniface, 2012.
  Étoiles et planètes, anthology established by André Desforges, Bordeaux, Les dossiers d'Aquitaine, 2012.
 La francophonie de la Colombie-Britannique : mémoire et fiction, directed by Guy Poirier, Ottawa: Éditions David, 2012.
  Les institutions littéraires en question dans la franco-amérique , edited by B. Doyon-Gosselin, D. Bélanger and C. Bérard, Laval University Press, 2014.
Cancer, le poète ne meurt jamais, anthology established by Regroupement des poètes francophones engagés pour la paix et la liberté, Rotterdam, Les Engagés Editions, 2017. 
Bref! 150 nouvelles pancanadiennes, directed by Charles Leblanc, Editions du Blé, 20

Interview 

 Une entrevue avec Laurent Poliquin, interview with Nina Berkhout CV2, vol. 30, no 1, summer 2007, p. 58-62.
 Une poétique assumée: rencontre avec Laurent Poliquin, interview with Perrine Foucault, L'Harmattan, May 2018.
 Entretien avec Laurent Poliquin par Bianca Deshaies, Milwaukee Review, vol. 92, July 2021, p. 42-49.

Awards and distinctions 
 2018 : Léopold Sédar Senghor International Poetry Prize
2018 : Canada Prize for ''De l'impuissance à l'autonomie'', finalist
2016 : Humanities Federation Scholarly Publishing Award for ''De l'impuissance à l'autonomie''
2015: Rue-Deschambault Literary Award for De l'amuïssement des certitudes
 2015: Aqua Books Lansdowne Prize for Poetry De l'amuïssement des certitudes, shortlisted
 2013: Aqua Books Lansdowne Prize for Poetry Marchand d'intensité, shortlisted
 2009–2012: Doctoral Scholarship Joseph-Armand Bombardier SSHRC
 2011: Margaret R. Pope Scholarship, University of Manitoba
 2011: Writing Fellowship from the Winnipeg Arts Council
 2010: Dr. Anita K. Ross Scholarship, University of Manitoba
 2009: Aqua Books Lansdowne Prize for Poetry  La Métisse filante, shortlisted
 2008: Marcel Richard Award, University of Manitoba
 2006: Duino Castle International Poetry Prize (Italy) to La Metisse filante, shortlisted
 2001: Alliance française Award (Molsheim, France)
 2001: Government of France Award

Electoral record

References 

Content in this edit is translated from the existing French Wikipedia article at :fr:Laurent Poliquin; see its history for attribution.

External links 

 www.laurentpoliquin.org
 www.mixcloud.com/Classiquequejaime

1975 births
Living people
Canadian poets in French
Candidates in the 2021 Canadian federal election
Green Party of Canada candidates in the 2021 Canadian federal election
Green Party of Canada candidates for the Canadian House of Commons
Politicians from Winnipeg
Writers from Quebec
Writers from Winnipeg
People from Trois-Rivières
Franco-Manitoban people
20th-century Canadian poets